General elections were held in Transjordan on 16 October 1937.

Electoral system
The 1928 basic law provided for a unicameral Legislative Council. The 16 elected members were joined by the six-member cabinet, which included the Prime Minister. The term length was set at three years.

Results
The sixteen elected members were:

By-election
By-elections were required after two members of the council were appointed governors in 1941. After being appointed as a Governor on 2 August, Abdallah al-Kulayb left the council and in the subsequent by-election, Muhammad Al-Sa'd was elected. On 6 September Shawkat Hameed was also appointed as a governor, with Omar Hekmat elected to replace him.

Aftermath
Five governments were formed during the term of the Legislative Council, which was extended by two years to last until 1942.
First government - in office until 28 September 1938
Led by Ibrahim Hashem and included Odeh Al-Qsous, Sa`id al-Mufti, Shukri Sha'sha'h, Hashem Khiar and Qasem Al-Hindawi. 
Second government (28 September 1938 to 6 August 1939)
Led by Tawfik Abu al-Huda and included  Hashem Khiar, Ahmad Olwi al-Saqaf, Abdullah al-Hmoud, Khalaf al-Tall and Nuqoula Ghanama. 
Third government (6 August 1939 to 24 September 1940)
Led by al-Huda and included Ahmad Olwi al-Saqaf, Nuqoula  Ghanama, Rasheeed al-Madfa'i, Abdullah al-Nemer and Ali al-Kayed.
Fourth government (25 September 1940 to 27 July 1941)
Led by al-Huda and included Omar Hekmat, Shukri Sha'sha'ah, Ahmad Olwi al-Saqaf, Nuqoula Ghanama and Ali al-Kayed.
Fifth government (29 July 1941 to 18 May 1943)
Led by al-Huda and included Ahmad Olwi al-Saqaf, Nuqoula Ghanama, Abdul-Muhdi al-Shamayleh, Samir al-Rifai and Abdullah Kolayb al-Shraideh.

References

Transjordan
Elections in Jordan
General election
Transjordan